The Baoruco hammer frog (Eleutherodactylus armstrongi) is a species of frog in the family Eleutherodactylidae found in the Dominican Republic and Haiti. Its natural habitats are subtropical or tropical moist lowland forest and subtropical or tropical moist montane forest.
It is threatened by habitat loss.

References

 List of Endangered species in Dominican Republic Updated on 2019-09-14.

armstrongi
Endemic fauna of Hispaniola
Amphibians of the Dominican Republic
Amphibians of Haiti
Amphibians described in 1933
Taxonomy articles created by Polbot